English rock band Chumbawamba has released fourteen studio albums, two live albums, three compilation albums, one soundtrack album, two extended plays (EPs), 23 singles, and 6 music videos.

Albums

Singles

Compilations

Compilation appearances
(not including top-single compilations)

Related releases

Miscellaneous cassettes
Another Year of the Same Old Shit (Sky and Trees, 1982)
"Common Ground" (Sky and Trees, 1984) (Benefit single for striking miners)
It Could Be So Much More (Acid Rain Products, 1984) (Joint with Flux of Pink Indians, recorded live at the Conway Hall, London)
History Luddite, (Homebrew Tapes, 1984) (Live at Luton Library, May 1985)
To Thine Own Self Be True (Sky and Trees, 1984)
In the Cellar (Sky and Trees?, 1984)
Know Your Enemy (Doomsday Tapes, 1986) (Live material recorded at the Bull and Gate, London)
Feed the World, 1986 (Live material recorded in Birmingham)
Un Toast a la Democratie, 1986 (Early live incarnation of "Never Mind the Ballots")
There Comes a Time, 1987 (Recordings of two shows)
Raising Heck with Chumbawamba (Peaceville Records, 1989) [recorded 1983/4](Live material plus songs by Simon Lanzon)

Notes

References

Discographies of British artists
Rock music group discographies